The 2023 Georgia Tech Yellow Jackets football team will represent the Georgia Institute of Technology as a member of the Atlantic Coast Conference during the 2023 NCAA Division I FBS football season. The Yellow Jackets expect to be led by Brent Key in his first year as Georgia Tech's head coach. They play their home games at Bobby Dodd Stadium in Atlanta, Georgia.

Previous season 
Georgia Tech is coming off of what was an up and down 2022 season. After starting the year 1-3, Head Coach Geoff Collins and his boss AD Todd Stansbury were fired. Former player and OL Coach Brent Key was named interim. Tech went 4-4 under Key to end the season 5-7 overall. The four wins included two road victories over nationally ranked opponents – a 26-21 win at No. 24 Pitt in his first game at the helm on October 1 and a 21-17 triumph at No. 13 North Carolina on November 19. Tech was also 4-4 in ACC play. The overall and conference win totals were Tech’s highest since 2018, as was its fourth-place finish in the ACC Coastal Division standings. Key’s Jackets also defeated the three teams that finished ahead of them in the coastal division. (North Carolina, Pitt and Duke). On Tuesday November 29, 2022 the interim tag was stripped and Key was named Georgia Tech’s 21st head football coach.

Schedule
Georgia Tech and the ACC announced the 2023 football schedule on January 30, 2023. The 2023 season will be the conference's first season since 2004, that its scheduling format just includes one division. The new format sets Georgia Tech with three set conference opponents, while playing the remaining ten teams twice in an (home and away) in a four–year cycle. The Yellow Jackets three set conference opponents for the next four years is; Clemson, Louisville, and Wake Forest.

References

Georgia Tech
Georgia Tech Yellow Jackets football seasons
Georgia Tech Yellow Jackets football